Agni College of Technology (ACT) established in the year 2001 by Sri Balaji Charitable and Educational Trust., located in Chennai, India. The college is approved by AICTE, New Delhi, Affiliated to Anna University Chennai, Accredited by National Board of Accreditation, New Delhi and an ISO 9001:2008 Certified Institution.

History 
The Agni College of Technology was established in the year 2001 by Sri Balaji Charitable and Educational Trust.

Agni College of Technology is an ISO 9001: 2008 Certified and the courses offered in ACT are recognized by the Government of Tamil Nadu. Approved by All India Council for Technical Education (AICTE) New Delhi Affiliated to Anna University, Chennai. UG Level: ECE, EEE and CSE are NBA (National Board of Accreditation) accredited.

Departments 
Undergraduate programmes
Aerospace engineering
 Computer Science & Engineering
 Electrical and Electronics Engineering
 Electronics and Communication Engineering
 Mechanical Engineering
 Information Technology
 Mechatronics
 Civil Engineering
 Biomedical Engineering

Postgraduate programmes
 Master of Business Administration
 M.E. Computer Science and Engineering
 M.E. Communication Systems
 M.E. Power Electronics and Drives
 M.E. Structural Engineering
 M.E. Manufacturing Engineering

Research and development
Agni College of Technology has established "Agni's Centre for Research & Development" (CRD), to provide high-quality research training for students, The Centre for Research & Development was established and inaugurated by the renowned scientist of ISRO and the Project Director of Chandrayaan I and Chandrayaan II, Dr.Mylswamy Annadurai on 14 April 2012.

Research areas
 Renewable Energy Technologies
 Hydrogen Energy & Fuel Cells
 Hybrid Electric Vehicle
 Alternate Fuels
 Energy Storage
 Nano Technology
 Clean Water Technologies
 Green Building
 Material Science
 Composite Materials
 Robotics
 Computer Integrated Manufacturing
 Computational Fluid Dynamics
 Power electronics
 System Modeling
 Intelligent Control and Optimization
 Automation and Instrumentation
 Data Warehousing and Data Mining
 Network Security
 Computer Vision
 Digital Image Processing
 Digital Signal Processing
 VLSI Design
 Sensors & Actuators

See also
Education in India
Literacy in India
List of institutions of higher education in Tamil Nadu

References
 Kindling the Scientific Spirit in Young Minds The New Indian Express 5 February 2015.
 Meet discusses industry, institution collaboration The New Indian Express 1 July 2014.
 Alumini Meet of Agni College Held The New Indian Express 15 July 2014.

External links 
 Agni College of Technology

Engineering colleges in Chennai
Colleges affiliated to Anna University
Educational institutions established in 2001
2001 establishments in Tamil Nadu